Mattishall Moor is a  biological Site of Special Scientific Interest  east of Dereham in Norfolk.

This area of calcareous fen and marshy grassland has a rich variety of flora. Black bog-rush, blunt-flowered rush and purple moor-grass are common in the fen areas, and purple moor-grass is also abundant in the grassland, together with other plants such as yellow rattle and marsh pennywort.

The site is private land with no public access.

References

Sites of Special Scientific Interest in Norfolk